Southern Railway 1643 is a preserved steam locomotive built in 1905 by the Pittsburgh Works of the American Locomotive Company for the Southern Railway. It is an 0-6-0 switcher locomotive that was part of the Southern Railway's A-7 class.

In 1952, the locomotive was sold to the Morehead and North Fork Railroad in Morehead, Kentucky.  Renumbered 12, the locomotive operated on the Morehead line, until the company dieselized on April 1, 1963.  After the locomotive was retired, it was put into storage in one of the road's engine sheds.  In 2011, No. 12 was purchased by Jerry Jacobson, who moved it to his Age of Steam Roundhouse building in Sugarcreek, Ohio. The locomotive was restored to operating condition in 2018, and it moved under steam for the first time in the 21st century on July 16.

References 

Individual locomotives of the United States
0-6-0 locomotives
Steam locomotives of Southern Railway (U.S.)
ALCO locomotives
Railway locomotives introduced in 1905
Standard gauge locomotives of the United States
Preserved steam locomotives of Ohio